Island Africa Talent is a television music competition franchise created by French producers Emmanuel Le Juez and Olivier Louyot to find new talents in African French countries. The winner of the show earns a contract with the African franchise of Universal Music Group along with 5 000 000 FCFA.
The first series of the show aired on A+, a channel of the Canal + Africa Group and various local channel, from October 24 to December 12 of 2014.

Creation and Production

Island Africa Talent is the first africanwide talent competition and was created to promote new African talents and to witness the creation of the African franchise of Universal Music Group.
Live shows stage took place in Yamoussoukro in Cote d'Ivoire and is watched nearly by 200 million people.

Participating countries

Judges and Presenters

Selection Process

Countries Audition

Auditions took place in the 12 participating countries ;
selected one act to represent each country at the live shows.

Live Shows

During the Live Shows only the grades given by the judges determines the rankings, and during the first five weeks there are no eliminations.
From week 5, the 3 contestants who received the lowest cumulative grade over the weeks are eliminated each week.
Live Shows took place during seven weeks.

Winners and Finalists

References

External links
 

Talent shows
Universal Music Group
Yamoussoukro
Canal+
Ivorian television series